Aichan Kara Giousouf (born on 
12 August 1963 in Yahyabeyli/Amaranta, Komotini, Greece) is a Greek politician from the West Thracian Turkish minority.

Born in a peasants family, he graduated in 1988 at the faculty of dentistry of the University of Istanbul, then worked for two years in Germany before coming back in Greece for the military service. In 1995, he served as secretary general of the Western Thrace Minority University Graduates Association, and between 1996 and 1999 as member of the board of the Dentists Association of Rhodope.

He became a member of Coalition of the Radical Left (SYRIZA) in 1994, and entered the Maroneia-Sapes municipal council. He was elected to the Greek Parliament for SYRIZA in the May 2012 Greek legislative election. He is atheist and in 2015 took the civilian oath as new member of the Greek Parliament.

External links

Sources

1963 births
Greek people of Turkish descent
Living people
Istanbul University alumni
Greek MPs 2012 (May)
Coalition of Left, of Movements and Ecology politicians
Greek MPs 2012–2014
Greek MPs 2015 (February–August)
Syriza politicians
Greek MPs 2015–2019

People from Maroneia